Kerry Burt is a Democratic politician, representing the 21st District in the Iowa House of Representatives. He won the election in November 2008 and was sworn in on January 12, 2009. He did not seek re-election in 2010 and was succeeded by Anesa Kajtazovic.

Burt graduated from Waterloo West High School.

Burt was arrested in February 2009 in Ankeny, Iowa after driving drunk and causing an auto accident. He pleaded guilty to the charge.

He took office in January 2009 and, in April 2010, announced that he would not seek re-election for the November 2010 elections because he was legally charged with tampering with school records. Court documents alleged that Burt used an inaccurate home address in Cedar Falls to enroll his child in the school, and that using the address allowed him to avoid paying higher tuition.

References

External links 
 Representative Kerry Burt official Iowa General Assembly site
 Kerry Burt State Representative official constituency site
 

African-American state legislators in Iowa
Democratic Party members of the Iowa House of Representatives
Living people
Year of birth missing (living people)
Place of birth missing (living people)
Maryland Commandos players
Iowa Hawkeyes football players
21st-century African-American people